Rashid Mamud (born 26 April 1978 in Malacca) is a Malaysian footballer who plays as a defensive midfielder for Malacca United F.C. in the FAM League. He can also play as a central defender.

Malacca United F.C.
On 13 November 2013, Rashid signed for Malaysian FAM League side Malacca United F.C. On that same day, Rashid made his debut for Malacca in a friendly match against Perak FA that ended in a 1-1 draw. Rashid was the only Malacca player to score in that match. Rashid is currently the captain of Malacca United F.C. On 21 January 2014, Rashid made his competitive debut for Malacca in a FA Cup Malaysia tie against Perlis FA that ended in 2-1 home loss. In that game, Rashid scored a free kick to level the game for Malacca.

External links
 

1978 births
Living people
Malaysian footballers
People from Malacca
Melaka United F.C. players
Negeri Sembilan FA players
Association football midfielders